Dhopakhali Union is an Union parishad of Kachua Upazila, Bagerhat District in Khulna Division of Bangladesh. It has an area of 40.38 km2 (15.59 sq mi) and a population of 16,495.

References

Unions of Kachua Upazila
Unions of Bagerhat District
Unions of Khulna Division